John Hines was a NASCAR Grand National Series race car owner.

Career
He was responsible for employing Fireball Roberts for nine races in the 1960 NASCAR Grand National Series season. Hines was also responsible for two of Fireball's wins in addition to two finishes in the "top five" and three finishes in the "top ten." Out of 1338 laps, Hines helps Roberts to lead in 578 of them. While only finishing an average of 23rd place after starting an average of first place, Hines would make $19,985 ($ when adjusted for inflation) by employing Fireball Roberts to his ride.

References

NASCAR team owners